Noël Mitrani (born 11 November 1969 in Toronto, Ontario) is a Canadian-born French film director, producer and screenwriter.

Biography

1999–2005: Early work in France
Born in Toronto from French parents, he went back to France age of 5. A graduate of history and philosophy at the Sorbonne, and for some time a press illustrator, Noël Mitrani entered cinema as a writer. He directed his first short film After Shave in 1999, a comedy set in a suburban supermarket, broadcast on Canal+.

Three other short films followed, the last of which Les Siens (broadcast on France 3 in 2003) addresses the confusion possible between dream and reality.

2006: Breakthrough with On the Trail of Igor Rizzi (Sur la trace d'Igor Rizzi) 
In 2005, Mitrani established his own production company, StanKaz Films, and produced his first feature-length film On the Trail of Igor Rizzi (Sur la trace d'Igor Rizzi), a black comedy starring Laurent Lucas and Isabelle Blais. The film won the Toronto International Film Festival Award for Best Canadian First Feature Film at the 2006 Toronto International Film Festival. In Cahiers du cinéma Charles-Stéphane Roy underlines the "quirky humor" of a film which "won the admiration of critics". The Toronto Film Review ranks the film among the top 100 Canadian films. According to the Toronto Star, "Mitrani's first feature, On the Trail of Igor Rizzi has all the earmarks – pink from cold though they may be – of a confidently assured and dangerously promising new talent".

Thanks to the critical success of his first film, Mitrani obtained a significant budget to direct The Kate Logan Affair (2010), a dark and mysterious thriller starring Alexis Bledel playing a psychologically unstable police woman who makes a big mistake and tries to clean it up. This film explores the seemingly harmless lines we sometimes cross, and the consequences which those actions ultimately have on those around us; and ourselves.

2013–present: An independent filmmaker 
His third picture The Military Man (Le Militaire), released in 2014, is a drama about a former French soldier, whose trauma caused by his memories of conflict leads him towards an unhealthy relationship with women. An entirely independent production shot guerrilla-style in two weeks on the streets of Montreal in Super 16, The Military Man pulls the audience into a troubling downward spiral of paranoia.

In his 2017 film Afterwards (Après coup), Mitrani dissects the insidiousness of guilt as well as the unsuspected possibilities of survival.

Noël Mitrani, who shot four films with actor Laurent Lucas, defines their collaboration as follows : “We have incredible coordination when it comes to emotions and feelings. I give him actions to do without needing to give him the reasons for it. You never need to intellectualize roles. I make the characters and Laurent gives them all their humanity thanks to his sober and finesse play ”.

Cassy (2019)focuses on sexual harassment, and features Natacha Mitrani, the director’s daughter, as Cassy.

During the COVID-19 pandemic, he participated in the Greetings from Isolation project which brings together many Canadian filmmakers who testify to their experience of confinement by making a short film.

In 2020, Mitrani filmed Between Them (Toutes les deux), a romantic comedy between two women, against a backdrop of male jealousy.

Filmography
(feature-length films)
On the Trail of Igor Rizzi (Sur la trace d'Igor Rizzi) - 2006
The Kate Logan Affair - 2010
The Military Man (Le Militaire) - 2013
Afterwards (Après coup) - 2017
Cassy - 2019
Between Them (Toutes les deux) - 2021
(short films)
After Shave - broadcast on Canal+, 1999
The Caudine Forks (Les Fourches caudines) - (as a screenwriter) - 1999
Bad Start (Mal barré) - 2000
Underground Parking (Viol à la tire), (alternative title : Le Parking souterrain)  - 2001
His (Les Siens) - broadcast on France 3, 2001
To Limit the Spread - The Greetings from Isolation Project - 2021

References

External links
 

Canadian emigrants to France
Franco-Ontarian people
French film directors
University of Paris alumni
Canadian male screenwriters
Canadian screenwriters in French
French male screenwriters
1969 births
Living people
Film directors from Toronto
Writers from Toronto
20th-century Canadian screenwriters
21st-century Canadian screenwriters